National Civilian Community Corps (NCCC), or AmeriCorps NCCC is an AmeriCorps program that engages 18- to 24-year-olds in team-based national and community service in the United States. Under the CARES act, however, the maximum age of entry is 26. National Civilian Community Corps teams complete about four different six- to eight-week-long projects during their 10-month term of service. Each team is made up of eight to twelve Corps Members and one Team Leader. Corps Members and Team Leaders are representative of all colors, creeds, states, and economic status. 

Approximately 1,200 Corps Members and Team Leaders are chosen annually to serve at one of four regional campuses, located in  Sacramento, California; Denver, Colorado; Vinton, Iowa; and Vicksburg, Mississippi. Each campus serves as a training center and hub for a multi-state region.  Members are required to complete a minimum of  1,700 hours of service, including 80 independent service hours, though members complete an average of 1,850 service hours per term.

In August 2012, the Corporation for National and Community Service (CNCS) and the Federal Emergency Management Agency (FEMA) partnered to develop FEMA Corps, a new cadre of NCCC members who follow the traditional NCCC model, but serve solely on disaster response and recovery related projects through FEMA.

The mission of the NCCC program is "To strengthen communities and develop leaders through direct, team-based national and community service."

Benefits 

While serving in AmeriCorps NCCC, Corps Members receive:
Living allowance of approx. $4,000 for 10 months of service
Room and board
Limited healthcare coverage
Uniforms
Training
Opportunity to earn up to 9 free college credits
At least $5,730 taxable Education Award (upon completion of the program)

After successfully completing a term of service, all AmeriCorps NCCC members are enrolled in the National Service Trust and are eligible to receive a Segal AmeriCorps Education Award. A Segal AmeriCorps Education Award can be used to pay education costs at qualified institutions of higher education, for educational training, or to repay qualified student loans. The award amount for full-time AmeriCorps programs, including NCCC, is currently $5,775 based on the maximum value of the Pell Grant. The award can be accessed in full or in part, and those qualified have seven years after their term of service has ended to claim the award. Individuals can only receive Education Awards for two terms of AmeriCorps service: Full-time, half-time, reduced half-time, quarter time, and minimum time terms of service each count as one term of service.

History

Inception (1992)
The NCCC program was loosely based on the depression-era Civilian Conservation Corps (CCC), although in practice, the differences between NCCC and CCC projects can be quite marked in both practical intent and outcome.  In some respects, NCCC teams resemble their CCC predecessors, who were also required to function under rugged conditions for prolonged periods and engage in strenuous conservation and wildfire-fighting projects, flood control, and disaster relief. Unlike the original CCC, the NCCC was not created to be a public work relief program, but rather was designed to help communities meet self-identified needs through service projects and develop leadership skills in its participants.

In 1992, "a bipartisan group of Senators worked hand-in-hand with the first Bush Administration to resurrect the CCC in a new form for a new era, creating what is now  as AmeriCorps NCCC"

Official founding (1993–2005)
With bipartisan sponsorship, the program was enacted into law in 1993 (referred to as the "Civilian Community Corps") and signed by President Bill Clinton as a demonstration program charged with determining:

 Whether federally funded residential service programs can significantly increase the support for national and community service
 Whether such programs can expand the opportunities for young men and women to perform meaningful, direct, and consequential acts of community service in a manner that will enhance their own skills while contributing to their understanding of civic responsibility in the United States
  Whether retired members of the armed forces can provide guidance and training under such programs that contribute meaningfully to the encouragement of national service
 Whether domestic national service programs can serve as a substitute for the traditional option of military service.

While some of the primary motivations cited in the 1993 inception of AmeriCorps NCCC changed and evolved over time, the basic focus of the program has remained the same: environment, education, public safety, and other unmet needs, disaster relief, and the addition of a "disaster services (preparedness and response)" heading in 2006.

2005 – present
Much of the Fiscal Year 2006 and 2007 funding issued to NCCC was directly specified as being intended for hurricane relief in the Katrina impacted upper-gulf region.  In 2007, in response to budget pressures, the Corporation for National and Community Service announced the closure of the Charleston, SC and Washington, DC campuses. Sixty percent of the remaining NCCC will be deployed to the Gulf Coast to aid with Hurricane Katrina relief until at least 2010.

In 2008 the National Civilian Community Corps opened a new campus in Vinton, Iowa. This was followed in July 2009 by the opening of a new campus in Vicksburg, Mississippi.

In 2014, the Mid Atlantic Headquarters moved from the Perry Point VA Medical Center Campus to the Sacred Heart of Mary School in Baltimore County, MD.

FEMA Corps

In 2012, the Federal Emergency Management Agency and The Corporation for National and Community Service created FEMA Corps. FEMA Corps, a track of the AmeriCorps National Civilian Community Corps (NCCC) program,  is a national service program dedicated to disaster response and recovery.

FEMA Corps is described as a "dedicated, trained, and reliable disaster workforce". Members serve full-time for ten months on federal disaster response and recovery efforts.  The first 231 members of the FEMA Corps class were inducted on September 30, 2012.  Members serve on teams of 8 to 12 people, and follow the traditional NCCC model of serving, living, and traveling together. Members receive a small living stipend of about of $3,000 ($150.00 every two weeks) over their ten months of service, and housing, food, and transportation costs are covered. Members also receive an education award of at least $5,730 after successfully completing 10 months of service.

Programs and projects

Overview
Before starting project work, members go through team building exercises, physical training and special training for the individual jobs they will hold on the team. They are also trained on how to use different tools and other equipment they might need throughout their projects.

Projects fall into one or more of five areas: disaster response, infrastructure improvement, environmental stewardship and conservation, energy conservation, and urban and rural development. The projects are developed by state government agencies or non-profit organizations such as Habitat For Humanity and the American Red Cross. Common examples of NCCC project tasks include trail building, tax assistance, home construction, tutoring students, tending community gardens, renovating public spaces, and disaster relief services.

Disaster Response

The National Civilian Community Corps may be called on to respond to any Federal or State disaster including fires, floods, earthquakes, oil spills, mudslides, hurricanes, tornadoes, or terrorist attacks. Americorps NCCC members routinely serve with the Federal Emergency Management Agency and the American Red Cross for other disaster relief efforts. Common examples of disaster relief projects include assisting with mass shelters, tarping roofs, removing debris, distributing food, water, and supplies, and mucking and gutting flooded homes.

Environment
NCCC performs environmental work in a number of areas, usually in collaboration with state and national parks. Common examples of environmental projects include removing invasive species, protecting native species, planting trees, building new trails, and maintaining existing trails.

Education

NCCC teams have worked in partnership with school systems across the country. A summary of national service work by AmeriCorps NCCC, released in early 2006, states that NCCC had by then tutored 319,000 students. In conjunction with the American Council on Education (ACE), NCCC Corps Members who complete course requirements during their year of service can earn undergraduate credits hours for "Introduction to Service Learning" and "Core Supervisory Skills" (See ACE's "National Guide Online"). Upon successful completion of service, NCCC Corps Members earn a (taxable) education award of $5,350 for college tuition—awards that are matched by many colleges and universities.

Fire fighting

All National Civilian Community Corps members are trained in CPR, first aid, and disaster services, and about 15 percent become red-card certified fire fighters. NCCC teams have successfully served in fighting major wildland fires and in completing fire mitigation work, according to National Park Service and U.S. Forest Service officials. The NCCC Southern Campus in Vicksburg, MS, has also recently teamed up with the US Forest Service to create three teams dedicated to wildland firefighting and serving with the Forest Service.

Summer of Service 

The NCCC Summer of Service is a shorter, 2-3 month-long service program designed to take place during the summer. The structure of the program is the same as the full-length term of service; members receive training at the beginning of their term and spend the rest of the summer completing service projects on their team of 8-12 members. The main differences between the full service year and the Summer of Service pertain to the hours requirement and member benefits. Members are only required to complete 300 service hours and there is no requirement for independent service hours. Members who graduate from the Summer of Service are eligible to receive a prorated Segal Education award worth $1,459.

Impact and reactions 

Since 1994, more than 12,000 members have invested more than 20 million service hours on 6,500 service projects with thousands of nonprofit organizations and other public agencies to provide disaster services, tutor children, preserve the environment, build homes for low-income families and meet other challenges.
In FY 2008, 60 percent of members served in the Gulf Coast Region on multiple team deployments assisting local communities to recover from the effects of Hurricanes Katrina, Rita, Gustav, Ike, Dolly, and Wilma.

Hurricane Katrina response 
AmeriCorps NCCC, a team-based residential program for 18–24 year-olds, has made Hurricane Katrina response its primary focus these past three years, deploying more than 4,000 members to intensive assignments in the Gulf. National Civilian Community Corps members have refurbished 9,500 homes, built 1,450 new homes, completed 52,000 damage assessments, and trained and supervised more than 227,000 volunteers.

Criticisms
AmeriCorps (which includes the NCCC program) is a US federally funded "network of more than 3,000 non-profit organizations, public agencies, and faith-based organizations."  AmeriCorps has met with sharp criticisms from  fiscal conservatives who accused it of being a "boondoggle", most notably by libertarian James Bovard in a Fox News article that covered proposals to cut funding for the program.

See also 
 AmeriCorps
 Camp Hope
 Community service
 National service
 Service learning
 Volunteerism
 Youth service

References

External links 
 NCCC official web site

AmeriCorps organizations
Service year programs in the United States
Environmental organizations based in Washington, D.C.
Emergency organizations
AmeriCorps